Franco Califano (14 September 1938 – 30 March 2013) was an Italian lyricist, composer, singer-songwriter, author and actor. During his career he sold about 20 million records.

Life and career 
Born in an airplane above Tripoli, Libya, Califano lived most of his life in Rome (in whose dialect he usually sang) and Milan. In the 1960s he began his career in music as a lyricist and a record producer; among his first successes as author "", "", "".

He was arrested in 1970 and again 1984 for possession of drugs; in both cases, Califano was acquitted with the formula "because the fact does not exist". In 1976 Califano got his first and main success as a singer with the song "", included in his eponymous fourth album, for which the critics paired him to the traditional French . During these years he continued his activity as lyricist signing, among others, the Sanremo Music Festival 1973 winner "" (performed by Peppino di Capri) and the Mia Martini's classic ""; he also composed a whole album for Mina, . In 1978 he released his best-sold album, .

In 1988 he entered the Sanremo Music Festival with the autobiographical song ""; he came back to Sanremo two more times, in 1994 with "" and in 2005 with "".

He died of a heart attack in his house in Acilia.

Discography 

 (1972)
 (1973)
 (1973)
 (1975)
 (1975)
, live at La Bussola in Viareggio (1975)
 (1976)
 (1977)
 (1977, collection)
 (1979)
 (1980)
 (1981)
 (1981, collection)
 (1982)
 (1982, live)
 (1983)
 (1983, collection )
 (1984)
 (1985)
 (1987)
 (1988)
 (1989)
 (1990)
 (1991)
 (1992, live)
 (1994)
 (1995)
 (1999)
 (2001, live)
 (2001, EP)
 (2003)
 (2005, collection)
 (2009)

Filmography

Further reading

References

External links 

 

1938 births
2013 deaths
People from Tripoli, Libya
Libyan people of Italian descent
Italian male film actors
Italian male writers
Italian male singer-songwriters
Italian male composers
20th-century Italian male singers
Libyan emigrants to Italy